Chakrapani Khanal, also known by his code name Baldev, is a Nepali communist politician and the current Member of Parliament (MP) from Kapilvastu 1. His father name is Bhagirath Khanal and his mother name is Muma Devi Khanal. He has served as the Minister for Agricultural and Livestock Development and as chief political adviser to Pushpa Kamal Dahal during his second prime ministership. He is standing committee member and secretary of Communist Party of Nepal (Maoist-Centre). He also served during the insurgency period as one of 4 deputy commanders of People's Liberation Army.He lives in Kapilvastu, Nepal. He is also current Lumbini Province  incharge for NCP (Maoist Centre). In his period as minister he stop the import of milk and meat from India to help the Nepalese farmer, so they can get more price for their product. He was removed from position of minister in 20th November, 2019 by Prime Minister at that time K.P Sharma Oli due to pressure from India a per different source. In his small tenure he was praised by many for his work and his standing support for Nepalese farmers. After he was succeeded by Ghanashyam Bhusal. The import banned was uplifted which was criticized by many farmers.

Electoral history
2017 House of Representatives Election

Kapilvastu-1

References

Living people
Nepal Communist Party (NCP) politicians
Communist Party of Nepal (Maoist Centre) politicians
Nepal MPs 2017–2022
1962 births
People from Arghakhanchi District